is a Japanese football player. He plays for Gamba Osaka.

Career
Ryo Yamashita joined Gamba Osaka in 2016. On May 8, he debuted in J3 League (v Fujieda MYFC).

Reserves performance

Last Updated: 23 July 2017

References

External links

1999 births
Living people
Association football people from Shiga Prefecture
Japanese footballers
J1 League players
J3 League players
Gamba Osaka players
Gamba Osaka U-23 players
Association football midfielders